Stian Lyngheim Theting (born 21 October 1976) is a Norwegian football defender/midfielder who plays for Sandnessjøen.

He joined FK Bodø/Glimt in 2004 from Skeid, and stayed there even after their relegation from the 2005 Norwegian Premier League. In 2010, he and Bodø/Glimt agreed to quit the contract. He now plays for Sandnessjøen IL.

Career statistics

References

100% Fotball - Norwegian Premier League statistics

1976 births
Living people
People from Alstahaug
Norwegian footballers
Kjelsås Fotball players
Skeid Fotball players
FK Bodø/Glimt players
Norwegian First Division players
Eliteserien players
Association football midfielders
Association football defenders
Sportspeople from Nordland